Teasdale and Metcalfe was a company based in Wetherby, West Yorkshire, England, who specialised in the manufacturing of prefabricated buildings for industrial and agricultural use.  The company had a large works off North Street in Wetherby.  In the late 1970s this was developed into the Horsefair Shopping Centre.  Teasdale and Metcalfe buildings are recognisable as they carry a red and white oval plaque with the T&M logo on.  Prior to manufacturing prefabricated buildings the company were dealers in agricultural equipment.

References

Wetherby